is a Japanese former competitive figure skater who is now a coach. He placed 23rd in the 1992 Winter Olympics.

Results

References 
Mitsuhiro Murata profile

1970 births
Living people
Japanese male single skaters
Olympic figure skaters of Japan
Figure skaters at the 1992 Winter Olympics
Sportspeople from Aomori Prefecture